MS Braemar (formerly Crown Dynasty, Cunard Crown Dynasty, Crown Majesty, and Norwegian Dynasty) is a cruise ship, most recently operating with Fred. Olsen Cruise Lines. During her Cunard ownership, she was marketed as Cunard Crown Dynasty, but her official name remained Crown Dynasty.

History

The vessel was constructed in 1993 for Crown Cruise Line, as Crown Dynasty, but she was marketed as the "Cunard Crown Dynasty" when Cunard Line signed an agreement to manage marketing, sales, and reservations for Crown Cruise Line. The vessel sailed under this name until 1997, when she was transferred to Majesty Cruise Line, which renamed her Crown Majesty. This only lasted until the end of 1997, when the vessel was transferred again, this time to Norwegian Cruise Line, which renamed her Norwegian Dynasty.

The vessel returned to her original fleet and name in 1999, but was sold to Fred. Olsen Cruise Lines in 2001, where the vessel currently operates under the name Braemar.

When built, the ship had a gross tonnage of 19,089, but she was stretched to her present size by Fred. Olsen Lines in 2009.

On 9 October 2019, while carrying her full capacity of 929 passengers, she became the longest ship ever to cruise through the Corinth Canal.

Coronavirus pandemic

On 8 March 2020, government officials in Cartagena, Colombia, announced that a recently disembarked passenger had tested positive for coronavirus disease 2019, and was accepted by a private local clinic for care. On 9 March 2020, government officials in Alberta, Canada, announced that a recently disembarked passenger had tested positive for coronavirus disease 2019. A day later, Alberta officials confirmed a second infection of a passenger returning from Braemar. On 13 March, the ship was denied entry to the Bahamas as a result of five passengers testing positive for the virus. For the same reason. Sint Maarten also denied a request from the cruise ship to allow passengers to fly out. The infected passenger disembarked off the cruise in Kingston, Jamaica, but it was unknown where they contracted the disease. On 16 March, it was announced that Cuba would accept the ship and evacuated all travelers to the United Kingdom.

References

External links

Fred Olsen Homepage
Additional pictures of the Braemar including its May 2010 visit to Dartmouth, Devon
Timelapse video of the enlarging of MS Braemar

Cruise ships
Passenger ships of Norway
1992 ships
Ships built in Spain
Cruise ships involved in the COVID-19 pandemic